Bulli was an electoral district of the Legislative Assembly in the Australian state of New South Wales in the Bulli area. It was originally created in 1930, replacing Wollongong. In 1971 it was abolished and was divided between the new electoral district of Heathcote and Corrimal. In 1991, Heathcote was abolished and Bulli was recreated. In 1999, Bulli was abolished and Heathcote was recreated.

Members for Bulli

Election results

References

Bulli
Bulli
Bulli
1930 establishments in Australia
1971 disestablishments in Australia
Bulli
Bulli
1991 establishments in Australia
1999 disestablishments in Australia